Giddings High School is a public high school located in the city of Giddings, Texas, United States and classified as a 4A school by the University Interscholastic League (UIL). It is a part of the Giddings Independent School District located in south central Lee County. In 2015, the school was rated "Met Standard" by the Texas Education Agency.

Athletics
The Giddings Buffaloes compete in these sports 

Volleyball, Cross Country, Football, Basketball, Powerlifting, Swimming, Soccer, Golf, Tennis, Track, Baseball & Softball

State titles
Football - 
1951(1A)
Boys Track - 
1987(3A)

References

External links
Giddings ISD website

Public high schools in Texas
Schools in Lee County, Texas